Absiella is a genus from the family of Erysipelotrichaceae.

See also
 List of bacterial orders
 List of bacteria genera

References

Further reading 
 

Erysipelotrichia
Bacteria genera